Albert John Maxsted (30 April 1916 – September 2001) was an English art director. He won an Academy Award in the category Best Art Direction for the film Nicholas and Alexandra.

Selected filmography
The Million Pound Note (1954)
The Purple Plain (1954)
Tiger in the Smoke (1956)
Rockets Galore! (1957)
Dangerous Exile (1957)
Whirlpool (1959)
When Eight Bells Toll (1971)
Nicholas and Alexandra (1971)
Diamonds Are Forever (1971)

Personal life
Maxsted married Edna M Barton in 1939.

References

External links

1916 births
2001 deaths
English art directors
Best Art Direction Academy Award winners